777 Charlie is a 2022 Indian Kannada-language adventure comedy drama film written and directed by Kiranraj K. and produced by Paramvah Studios. It stars Charlie, a labrador dog in the titular role, and Rakshit Shetty alongside Sangeetha Sringeri, Raj B. Shetty, Danish Sait and Bobby Simha. The film follows the journey and bonding between a lonely factory worker and a stray labrador dog.

777 Charlie was announced in September 2017. Principal photography took place from June 2018 to October 2021, with delays due to COVID-19 pandemic. The film was shot in various locations across Karnataka, Goa, Gujarat, Rajasthan, Punjab, Himachal Pradesh and Kashmir. 777 Charlie had a limited theatrical release on 2 June 2022, and released in cinemas worldwide on 10 June 2022. The film received critical acclaim for its cast performances (particularly Rakshit Shetty and Charlie), writing, emotional weight and direction. With theatrical earnings of over  globally, 777 Charlie became the fifth highest-grossing Kannada film at the time of release.

Plot 
A Labrador puppy escapes from the house of a breeder where many dogs have been caged and tortured. The pup continues its journey and finally reaches the Chinmaya colony, Satara where Dharma resides. Dharma is a loner in a colony, who doesn't socialize with anyone and is feared among the colony people. His life consists of mainly working at the factory, fights, booze, smoke and watching Charlie Chaplin shows on TV. He is an orphan, whose parents and sister died in a car crash caused by a dog and thereby leads a monotonous life. A musical fest at his colony makes the puppy scared and Dharma is enraged as his sleep is disturbed where he destroys the band instruments. The puppy views Dharma as her saviour and secretly follows him. 

The Labrador takes shelter in the dustbin outside his house and consumes the leftover idli thrown by Dharma without his knowledge. It tries to gain attention of Dharma, but in vain. One day, the dog follows him and gets into a road accident. Feeling pity for the dog after watching Charlie Chaplin's bond with a dog, Dharma takes it to the hospital where he is advised by Dr. Ashwin Kumar to let the dog stay with him, till an adopter comes forward and advises obtaining a dog license. Though reluctant as the colony members do not allow dogs, Dharma agrees and takes care of the dog where the bonding between him and the dog grows to an extent where Dharma becomes a better person and names the dog Charlie after Charlie Chaplin and takes care of the dog with a child in the colony named Adrika aka Adi. 

One day, Charlie loses consciousness where Dharma learns that Charlie is suffering from cancer (hemangiosarcoma of spleen) and this genetic defect has happened due to the breeder's unwanted breeding techniques and constant torture as Charlie is a female dog. Distraught, Dharma decides to fulfill Charlie's wishes where he learns that Charlie likes to play in snow as whenever snow appears on TV, she gets excited. He leaves with Charlie for Himachal Pradesh. An animal welfare activist Devika thinks that Dharma tortures charlie and decides to follow him to gather proofs to confront him and charge him. En route, Dharma learns about Charlie's breeder from the vet doctor and receives a video of Charlie being tortured where he learns that Charlie's name was actually Keaton. Dharma confirms this by addressing Charlie as Keaton thereby Charlie responding to the name and shown to be in fear. He reaches the breeder's house and thrashes him. 

The breeder is later caught by the police. The rest of the dogs get rescued by the animal welfare team. Devika learns about this incident through her team and develops a soft corner for Dharma and tells him she is ready for any help he requires but she has to leave due to scheduled commitments at her job. Through Devika, Dharma meets Karshan Roy, who promises to publish his story in a magazine. Dharma and Charlie leave for Punjab where they meet a dog lover named Vamshinathan, who is a Tamilian and his dog Blacky, where Dharma and Charlie spent few days with Vamshi. Vamshi provides a dog competition pass to Dharma, but they become contestants where Charlie does a long jump, supported by Dharma winning the hearts of all the audiences and the competition as well. Without money and food, Dharma sells his bike and walks to continue their journey but Charlie's condition worsens. 

Dharma takes him to a monastery and learns that Charlie was pregnant with Blacky's child, but the puppies couldn't survive. The duo continue their journey in the bus but the bus is stopped by the army, and they reveal that a landslide occurred. After requests from Dharma, an officer agrees to take Charlie to Kashmir. Dharma and Charlie sneak out and play in snow and return back to the camp. The following day, Charlie goes missing and Dharma leaves in search of Charlie. After a long search, he finds her at a temple waiting for him, who sits in his lap, then thanks him with her gesture and dies in Dharma's arms. Dharma is distraught but finds a puppy inside the temple and realises that Charlie gifted the puppy to him as she knows that Dharma cannot survive without her. 

A few months later, Dharma along with Devika, Adrika and the colony people inaugurate an animal rescue and shelter in the memory of Charlie, where Dharma sits next to Charlie's memorial and goes through the article published about the journey of Charlie and Dharma. Charlie's puppy, which is also named Charlie, is shown to be more mischievous than its mother.

Cast

Production

Development
In September 2017, Rakshit Shetty announced his next film under the production banner Paramvah Studios titled as 777 Charlie. Kiranraj K, who had assisted Rishab Shetty in Ricky and Kirik Party, was brought on board for the project, which marked his directorial debut. Shetty agreed to produce the film as the script was considered to be "first-of-its-kind" in Kannada cinema. Kiranraj also revealed that some sequences in the film were inspired from his real-life incidents. Before the film's production in June 2018, dog trainer BC Pramod trained three Labrador Retrievers to play the role of Charlie in the film for three weeks, as the bonding between the dog and the lead actor was to be real and convincing.

Casting 
The makers initially considered Aravinnd Iyer as the lead actor, whom Shetty had recommended after working with him in Kirik Party. Shetty stated that "The character in the film works in a vehicle manufacturing factory and wears a rugged look, and even the neighbourhood children are scared of him. The role perfectly suited Aravinnd and he came on board". But, as the production delayed, Iyer left the project in February 2018 as his schedule clashed with that of Bheemasena Nalamaharaja (2020). Subsequently, Shetty replaced him in the lead role. In May 2018, Pushkara Mallikarjunaiah announced a casting call for the film's female lead, in which Sangeetha Sringeri was selected as the female lead from the audition with over 2,700 entries. Raj B. Shetty joined the cast in July 2018, where he played the role of a veterinary doctor. Danish Sait also joined the shoot in the first schedule. Child artists Sharvari and Praanya P Rao, also appeared a part of the film. In November 2020, it was announced that Tamil actor Bobby Simha would appear in a cameo role, marking his debut in the Kannada film industry.

Filming
The film's principal photography began in Mangalore on 8 June 2018, with Shetty joining the shoot after simultaneously working on the production of Avane Srimannarayana (2020). Kiranraj chose to shoot the first schedule in Mangalore as the opening sequences since "Charlie (the protagonist), who escapes from one place to another, finds himself in a fish market. As the scene needed an exclusive fish selling zone, which is not available anywhere in the state, which is why we chose Mangalore." The team shot a few sequences at Sakleshpur and then moved to Mysore and Bangalore, where Shetty joined the shooting schedule. In September 2018, it was revealed that portions with young Charlie had been completed, and the team needed to take a break, since Shetty planned to resume shooting for Avane Srimannarayana. The film has music by Nobin Paul, cinematography by Aravind Kashyap, and editing by Pratheek Shetty.

In March 2018, the team resumed the shooting in Mysore with scenes featuring the protagonist in his old-house as Mysore had old buildings, which suited the script. The team planned a 30-day schedule in the location and Shetty simultaneously worked on the film along with Avane Srimannarayana as he planned to release the two films within that year. Later, the team shot a few sequences in the Dandeli forest. Soon after the release of Avane Srimannarayana, Shetty rejoined the production team in late-January 2020 to shoot major sequences in North India. A montage song showcasing the bond between Charlie and Shetty was filmed in Goa. The makers also filmed a few portions in Goa, Maharashtra, Gujarat, Rajasthan and Punjab. 777 Charlie completed 100 days of filming in March 2020, before the COVID-19 pandemic brought the production to a halt.

Filming resumed in October 2020 after a six-month break with sequences being shot in Bangalore and Kodaikanal. Later, the team went on a location scouting in Himachal Pradesh and Kashmir to shoot more sequences, which began on 20 November 2020. Shetty joined the Kashmir schedule during the first week of December. However, due to the unpleasant weather, the team delayed the production, until filming resumed in January 2021. The film's schedule in Kashmir was completed on 27 January 2021. In June 2021, director Kiranraj stated that the team had filmed for a total of 160 days, with visuals for end credits pending to be shot. After 164 days of filming, including shooting for the patchwork scenes, the makers wrapped up the shoot on 25 October 2021.

Post-production 
The post-production simultaneously began on 29 January 2021, when the team had completed 90% of the film's production. It was reported that Nobin Paul had started working on the film's background score during the COVID-19 pandemic lockdown in August 2020. Rakshit Shetty began dubbing for the portions during March 2021, and the production team announced that 70% of the dubbing work had been completed. Since the film was to have a pan-India release, director Kiranraj and his team chose more than 200 voice artists to dub for the 50+ characters in five languages. He made sure that "the film never feels like a 'dubbed' film in other languages but instead the authenticity and local flavor is maintained in each version". After the completion of the filming, Kiranraj announced a December 2021 theatrical release.

Music 

The score and soundtrack of 777 Charlie is composed and produced by Nobin Paul.

Release

Theatrical 
777 Charlie had a limited theatrical release on 2 June 2022 with special preview screenings across 21 Indian cities starting with Delhi and Amritsar, and later moving to Jaipur, Mumbai, Kochi, Chennai, Pune on June 6 and Hyderabad, Ahmedabad, Nagpur, Solapur, Thiruvananthapuram, Varanasi, and Coimbatore on 7 June. The film was released worldwide in cinemas on 10 June 2022.

Earlier in May 2021, director Kiranraj announced in an interview that 777 Charlie will have a theatrical release during the fourth quarter of that year. He said that "considering the budget, scale and the pan-Indian approach, one cannot assure the film being streamed in an over-the-top media service. The making of the film has been very taxing deal on us, sure, but the whole team wishes that the audience gets to see the film on the big screen. We have our hopes pinned on the vaccination drive and the government's approach in controlling the pandemic, thus the audience will be receptive to watching films in the theatres." The film will also be dubbed and released in Hindi, Telugu, Tamil, and Malayalam languages.

The team planned to release the film on the last week of December, as the producers had a sentiment with Shetty's last two successful releases Kirik Party and Avane Srimmannarayana had released on the last week of December. In September 2021, the makers announced that 777 Charlie would be released theatrically on 31 December 2021, coinciding the New Year's Eve. A few weeks before the scheduled release, the producers announced that the premiere would be postponed. Apart from being considered for a dubbed version in Russian, it was reported to be one of the 39 movies considered by China to dub in their language.

Distribution 
In June 2021, Prithviraj Sukumaran who watched few scenes from the preview of this film, had agreed to acquire the rights under the Prithviraj Productions banner for the film's Malayalam-dubbed version. The same month, Karthik Subbaraj's Stone Bench Films acquired the distribution rights for the Tamil-dubbed version.

Home media
The film was digitally streamed on Voot Select on 29 July 2022. Prime Video announced that the film was available for rentals, for ₹199, to both prime and non-prime customers in India, from 30 September 2022 in Hindi, Tamil, Telugu, and Malayalam.

Reception

Critical reception
Grace Cyril of India Today rated the film 4 out of 5 stars and wrote "777 Charlie is filled with emotional, fun and aww-worthy moments". Tini Sara Anien of Deccan Herald rated the film 4 out of 5 stars and wrote "777 Charlie' is a family film with a difference and let's hope the film inspires a healthy trend in Kannada cinema". A critic for Sakshi Post rated the film 4 out of 5 stars and wrote "Rakshit Shetty's 777 Charlie is an emotional rollercoaster ride". Archika Khurana of The Times of India rated the film 3.5 out of 5 stars and wrote "
'777 Charlie' is a treat for fans of both Rakshit Shetty and films that convey essential messages, such as pet adoption in this case. There is a lot of heart and soul in the movie, with moments that will leave you with teary eyes at the end". Shubham Kulkarni of Koimoi rated the film 3.5 out of 5 stars and wrote "777 Charlie is a film made for you to suspend your disbelief and watch with all your hearts laugh, cry". Latha Srinivasan of Firstpost rated the film 3.5 stars out of 5 stars and wrote "Kiranraj K's 777 Charlie makes you feel emotions you haven't felt in a while and honestly it's a good feeling". Soundarya Athimuthu of The Quint wrote "Even if you are not a pet lover, 777 Charlie will turn you into one". A Sharadhaa of The New Indian Express rated the film 3.5 out of 5 stars and wrote "777 Charlie is definitely an ode to dog lovers and Kiranraj, Rakshit and Co have crafted it in such a way that even if you are not one, watching this film just might make you revisit that stance". Nandini Ramnath of Scroll.in rated wrote "Dharma's road trip with Charlie seemingly has a destination, but the film takes forever to get there". Manoj Kumar R of The Indian Express rated the film 3 out of 5 stars and wrote "Amid larger-than-life, violence-prone cinema we have watched this year, this Rakshit Shetty-starrer offers a quieter experience of self-reflection about the absurdity of life".

Box Office
The box office collections of the movie was reported by various sources with varying degrees of accuracy. While the movie collected ₹1.10 crore from previews on Thursday, the first day collection was around ₹4.9 crores to ₹6.27 crores(net).
The second day collection was reported to be around ₹6.25 crores to ₹7.87 crores (net). Multiple sources reported the  third day collection to be around ₹7.5 crores to ₹9.5 crores to ₹10.01 crore(net) taking the first weekend collections to ₹19.75 crores to ₹20 crores to ₹ 23.5 crores to ₹24.15 crores (net) to ₹27 crores. The five day collections were reported to be around ₹32.7 crores to ₹35 crores. It was also reported to have collected over ₹2.1 crores in Kerala in 6 days making it the third highest grossing Kannada film there. While the six day collections stood at ₹35.7 crores, the first week collections were reported to be around ₹38.65 crores to ₹38.9 crores to ₹47.25 crores. The movie was reported to have grossed ₹50.1 crores in 8 eight days of which ₹36 crores was from Karnataka; ₹2 crores from Andhra Pradesh & Telangana; ₹2.25 crores from Kerala; ₹1 crore from Tamil Nadu; ₹2 crores from rest of India and ₹6.85 crores from overseas. By the end of 10 days, the movie had collected around ₹50.75 crores to ₹53.1 crores. While the movie collected ₹1.5 crores within 5 days in Kerala, it went on to surpass the ₹3 crore mark within 12 days there. The gross collections of the movie was reported to be around ₹75 crores in 12 days and ₹90 crores in 17 days. The movie minted over ₹4.05 crores in Kerala within 17 days and went on to collect ₹4.5 crores in 24 days there and was reported to be heading towards ₹5 crore mark in Kerala. The movie was reported to have collected ₹95 crores in 22 days.
On the occasion of 25 day success meet, Rakshit Shetty revealed the total gross revenue of the movie - from all the sources (such as theatre, digital, satellite, music and remake rights) to be ₹150 crores out of which ₹100 crores was reported to be the theatrical collections. At the end of 30 days, it was reported to have collected ₹4 crores each from both Telugu and Tamil versions and ₹5.5 crores from the Malayalam version. The Hindi version was reported to have collected ₹7 crores. While The Times of India reported that the film collected ₹100 crores, Odisha TV reported the worldwide collection at the end of 60 days to be around ₹105.72 crore. The closing collections were reported to be ₹105 crores.

Legacy 
The demand for Labradors was reported to have increased after the release of the film. However, experts and activists were of the view that pets should not be brought home on the basis of short term plan based on temporary flow of emotions since it would lead to sudden spike in their demand leading to unethical breeding which ironically was spoken against in the movie. A sniffer dog inducted into the Mangalore police department was named Charlie.

References

External links
 

2022 films
2022 comedy-drama films
2020s Kannada-language films
2022 adventure films
Films about dogs
Films shot in Bangalore
Films shot in Mangalore
Films shot in Mysore
Films shot in Goa
Films shot in Kodaikanal
Films shot in Gujarat
Films shot in Rajasthan
Films shot in Punjab, India
Films shot in Himachal Pradesh
Films shot in Jammu and Kashmir
Film productions suspended due to the COVID-19 pandemic
Films postponed due to the COVID-19 pandemic
2020s adventure comedy-drama films
Indian adventure comedy-drama films